Article 14 is a CD released by Irregular Records. It is a compilation of many different British artists. Money from the sale of this album goes to The Medical Foundation For The Care Of Victims Of Torture.

Track listing
"The A39s"
"Razor Wire Fence" – 3:55
"Alula Andeta"
"Sacrifice" – 4:06
"Boka Halat"
"Gumbay" – 5:50
"Chumbawamba"
"Bella Ciao" – 3:41
"Fun">Da>Mental
"Wandering Soul" – 4:23
"Robb Johnson"
"Hands Off My Friends" – 2:33
"Bill Jones"
"Panchpuran" – 3:53
"Barb Jungr"
"Mother Tongue" – 2:45
"Claire Martin"
"River Man" – 4:34
"Rory McLeod"
"A Foreigner Forever" – 6:58
"Ahmed Mukhtar"
"Hewar" – 3:24
"Orchestre Super Moth"
"Salt of the Earth" – 3:52
"Jocelyn Pook"
"Take Off Your Veil" – 4:57
"Tom Robinson"
"We Didn't Know (What Was Going On)" – 4:14
"Leon Rosselon"
"They Said" – 3:25
"SJK"
"Never Coming Back" – 4:54
"Rajan Spolia"
"Ali Baba's Midnight Gallop" – 5:27
"Mauricio Venegas"-Astorga
"Icaro" – 3:58

Personnel

Musicians
?

Other personnel
?

External links
Medical Foundation for the Care of Victims of Torture
article
Official website

2001 compilation albums